Ikegami can refer to:

Companies
Ikegami Tsushinki, manufacturer of broadcast television equipment

People
Akira Ikegami
Haruki Ikegami, victim of the bombing of Philippine Airlines Flight 434
Hidetsugu Ikegami
Kimiko Ikegami
Ryoichi Ikegami

Places
Ikegami Honmon-ji
Ikegami Station

Train lines
Tōkyū Ikegami Line

Japanese-language surnames

ja:池上